Rohkunborri National Park is a national park in Troms county, Norway, that was established in 2011.

The park includes parts of the Sørdalen valley (canyon), the large lake Geavdnjajávri, and the mountain Rohkunborri. The large lakes Altevatnet and Leinavatnet both lie just north of the park boundary.

The nature varies from rich boreal deciduous forest on the lower elevations to alpine tundra higher up. The park is home to brown bears, wolverines, and lynx, as well as the snowy owl, gyrfalcon, and reindeer (with Sami owners). There are also wetlands and alpine vegetation on bedrock rich in lime, as well as bogs. The Arctic rhododendron (no:Lapprose) is present. The lakes in the eastern part have Arctic char.

Gallery

References

External links

Recent photos from Rohkkunborri NP
Images from Rohkunborri National Park

National parks of Norway
Protected areas established in 2011
Protected areas of Troms og Finnmark
Tourist attractions in Troms og Finnmark
Bardu
2011 establishments in Norway